HNLMS Jacob van Heemskerck was a unique coastal defence ship of the Royal Netherlands Navy built by the Rijkswerf in Amsterdam. She was among the ships send to patrol the Venezuelan coast during the Second Castro Crisis. After her active career she was rebuilt into a stationary battery ship and recommissioned. During World War II she was captured by the invading German forces and converted in an anti-aircraft battery. After the war the ship was recovered and given back to the Netherlands, to be converted to an accommodation ship.

Design
Two  single turret guns provided the ship's main armament, and these were augmented by six single  guns and six  single guns. The ship had a complement of 340 men.

Service history
The ship was built at the Rijkswerf in Amsterdam. Prince Henry of the Netherlands attended the launch ceremony and christened the ship on 22 September 1906. The ship was commissioned on 22 April 1908. The same year she, together with the s Friesland and Gelderland were sent to patrol the Venezuelan coast during the Second Castro Crisis.

On 16 May 1910 the ship left the port of IJmuiden to steam for Sheerness to bring Prince Henry of the Netherlands to the funeral of Edward VII of the United Kingdom of Great Britain and Ireland that was held on 20 May. During the last part of the journey the ship was escorted by five British torpedo boats.
Later that year the Belgian king Albert I and his wife made a state visit to the Netherlands. During this visit, they visited the IJ in Amsterdam where Jacob van Heemskerck, Friesland,  and other Dutch warships were present and fired shots in salute. The pair were given a tour on the van Heemskerck.

On 24 July the ship left the port Den Helder for the coronation fleet review of King George V at Spithead on 27 June.

On 17 May 1917 the ship, together with the lugger Zorg en Vlijt picked up the crew of the luggers Mercurius and Jacoba that were boarded and later scuttled by a German submarine 50 nautical miles off the coast of IJmuiden.

World War II
After her active career she was rebuilt into a stationary battery ship and renamed Batterijschip IJmuiden and recommissioned on 19 April 1939. She was stationed in IJmuiden. During the German invasion in World War II on 14 May 1940 she was scuttled by her crew to prevent her being captured by the German forces.

The Germans however raised the ship on 16 July 1940 and towed her to Amsterdam on 24 July. From there she was towed to Kiel in March 1941. There she was rebuilt into a floating anti-aircraft battery at the Howaldtswerke and renamed Undine.
After the war she was found back in Wilhelmshafen and returned to the Netherlands.

At the Rijkswerf in Amsterdam she was rebuilt into an accommodation ship. She was recommissioned on 23 February 1948 and renamed Neptunus. This role she fulfilled until her decommissioning on 13 September 1974. On 4 October that same year she was stricken.

Notes

References

External links

Description of ship
 Netherlamnds Navy: Description of ship

Coastal defence ships of the Royal Netherlands Navy
1906 ships
Naval ships of the Netherlands captured by Germany during World War II
Ships built in Amsterdam
Maritime incidents in May 1940
World War II cruisers of the Netherlands